Brownsville, California may refer to:
Brownsville, former name of Samoa, California
Brownsville, former name of Tecopa, California